The 2004 United States presidential election in Connecticut took place on November 2, 2004, and was part of the 2004 United States presidential election. Voters chose seven representatives, or electors to the Electoral College, who voted for president and vice president.

Connecticut was won by Democratic nominee John Kerry by a margin of 10.4%. Prior to the election, all 12 news organizations considered this a state Kerry would win, or otherwise considered as a safe blue state. In presidential elections, Connecticut is usually expected to fall into the Democrats' electoral vote column, as no Republican has won the state since Bush's father George H. W. Bush in 1988. Although Connecticut was the birth state of George W. Bush, and the Bush family does have a house in the state, Connecticut was never considered competitive in 2004. This is the only election since 1876 in which the Republican nominee won the popular vote without carrying Connecticut, and the only election ever in which a Republican won two terms without ever carrying the state.  As of 2020, this is the most recent election where Connecticut voted more Democratic than California and Hawaii.

As of 2020, this was the most recent presidential election in which the Republican nominee carried the towns of Bethel, Cheshire, and Madison. Bush became the first ever Republican to win without carrying the towns of Redding and Simsbury, the first to win without winning the town of Essex since that town was founded in 1852, the first to win without the town of Lyme since 1872, and the first to win without the town of Roxbury since 1904

Primaries
2004 Connecticut Democratic presidential primary

Campaign

Predictions
There were 12 news organizations who made state-by-state predictions of the election. Here are their last predictions before election day.

Polling

Kerry won every single pre-election poll. The final 3 poll averaged Kerry leading 52% to 42% for Bush and 2% for Nader.

Fundraising
Bush raised $4,256,438. Kerry raised $4,195,038.

Advertising and visits
Neither campaign visited or advertised in this state during the fall campaign.

Analysis
All counties but Litchfield County and congressional districts went Democratic. Litchfield County is regarded as the most conservative county in the state, along with adjacent Fairfield County to the south, although this county does tend to vote majority Democratic. Hartford County, Middlesex County, New Haven County, and New London County each are regarded as the most loyally democratic counties in Connecticut. The Republican Party's last presidential victory in Connecticut was during the 1988 election of George H. W. Bush. However, Kerry's victory in Connecticut was not as large as Al Gore's lead in 2000, when the then-vice president won the state by 17.47% percent and a majority of all the state's counties. However, in 2000 Gore's running mate was Connecticut Senator Joe Lieberman.

George W. Bush lost Connecticut decisively even though he was born in New Haven and is part of a family that has been a political dynasty in Connecticut for much of the 20th century. Despite his family background, as a presidential candidate Bush was considered a Texan and largely perceived as a Southern candidate, and consequently he had little appeal to voters in Northeastern states like Connecticut. Ironically, despite not winning his own birth state, Bush did win Colorado, Kerry's birth state, making this the only presidential election since 1864 where no candidate was able to win the state of the birth.

Results

By county

Counties that flipped from Democratic to Republican 
 Litchfield (largest municipality: Torrington)

By congressional district
Kerry won all 5 congressional districts, including three held by Republicans.

Electors

Technically the voters of Connecticut cast their ballots for electors: representatives to the Electoral College. Connecticut is allocated 7 electors because it has 5 congressional districts and 2 senators. All candidates who appear on the ballot or qualify to receive write-in votes must submit a list of 9 electors, who pledge to vote for their candidate and his or her running mate. Whoever wins the majority of votes in the state is awarded all 7 electoral votes. Their chosen electors then vote for president and vice president. Although electors are pledged to their candidate and running mate, they are not obligated to vote for them. An elector who votes for someone other than his or her candidate is known as a faithless elector.

The electors of each state and the District of Columbia met on December 13, 2004, to cast their votes for president and vice president. The Electoral College itself never meets as one body. Instead the electors from each state and the District of Columbia met in their respective capitols.

The following were the members of the Electoral College from Connecticut. All were pledged to John Kerry and John Edwards:
 Elizabeth O'Neill
 Andrea J. Jackson-Brooks
 Donna King
 Larry Pleasant
 David J. Papandrea
 Andres Ayala
 Joshua King

See also
 United States presidential elections in Connecticut

References

External links
US Election Atlas, by David Leip
Detailed results by Town, on Boston Globe's site

Connecticut
2004
Presidential